Watergate is a hamlet in the civil parish of Advent in Cornwall, England, United Kingdom. There is also a hamlet called Watergate in the civil parish of Pelynt in Cornwall.

References

Hamlets in Cornwall